The 1970 FIBA Europe Under-18 Championship was an international basketball  competition held in Greece in 1970.

Final ranking
1. 

2. 

3. 
 
4. 

5. 

6. 

7. 

8. 

9. 

10. 

11. 

12.

Awards

External links
FIBA Archive

Youth
FIBA
1970
FIBA U18 European Championship